Robert Peter Freytag (7 April 1916 in Vienna – 8 July 2010 in Munich), known professionally as Robert Freitag, was an Austrian-Swiss stage and screen actor and film director.

Life 
Freitag was the son of the Swiss opera singer Otto Freitag (Otto Freytag). He was trained as an actor at the Max Reinhardt Seminar in Vienna.  During the Nazi era, he went to Switzerland, where he was active as an actor at the Schauspielhaus Zürich (Zürich playhouse). In 1945, he married the German actress Maria Becker, who had studied acting in Vienna and who since had been at the Schauspielhaus Zürich, which had benefitted from the presence of German émigrés during the Second World War. Becker became a Swiss citizen by marrying Freitag.

In 1949, Freitag began participating in the Salzburg Festival. Later he performed, among other places, at the Deutsches Schauspielhaus and the Hamburger Kammerspiele, both in Hamburg.

With his wife Maria Becker and the German stage actor Will Quadflieg, he founded the Zürcher Schauspieltruppe in 1956 in Zürich, where he was also a part-time administrator. That troupe performed throughout the German-speaking countries and in the United States.

On stage, he played many classical and modern roles. Beginning in 1941, he appeared in films— in particular in the starring role in William Tell. Later, he often appeared on television.

Freitag and Maria Becker were divorced in 1966, but they continued to work together, especially in the travelling theater company Schauspieltruppe Zürich that they had founded. They had three sons, two of whom—Benedict Freitag and Oliver Tobias—became actors.

In 1994, Freitag's autobiography, Es wollt mir behagen, mit Lachen die Wahrheit zu sagen  was published by Pendo Verlag.

In 2001, at the age of 85, he had a role in the made-for-TV film Die Liebenden vom Alexanderplatz (The Alexanderplatz Lovers), directed by Detlef Rönfeldt.

Freitag's second marriage, to the German actress Maria Sebaldt, lasted from 1966 until his death. They lived in Grünwald, Bavaria. They had a daughter.

Filmography

External links

Notes and references 

1916 births
2010 deaths
Austrian male film actors
Swiss male film actors
Austrian male television actors
Swiss male television actors
Austrian male stage actors
Swiss male stage actors
20th-century Austrian male actors
20th-century Swiss male actors
Austrian people of Swiss descent